David Field may refer to:

Persons
David Field (actor), Australian actor
David Field (author), American author
David Field (astrophysicist) (born 1947), astrophysicist and author
David Dudley Field I (1781–1867), American Congregational clergyman and historical writer
David Dudley Field II (1805–1894), American lawyer and law reformer

See also
David Field Beatty, 2nd Earl Beatty

Transportation
David Field, the World War II name for Enrique Malek International Airport, Panama